Caminero is a surname. Notable people with the surname include:

Arquimedes Caminero (born 1987), Dominican Republic baseball player
José Luis Caminero (born 1967), Spanish footballer
Roberto Caminero (1945–2010), Cuban boxer
Wilfredo Caminero (born 1954), Filipino politician

See also
El Caminero (Mexico City Metrobús), a BRT station in Mexico City

Spanish-language surnames